Following the 2017 election, Venstre won the mayor's position from the Conservatives who had held it since 1994. From 1970 to 1993, Venstre had also held the position, and they remain the only parties to have held it in the municipality.  

In this election, Conservatives would win 7 seats, and become the largest party in front of Venstre with 6 seats. Venstre still tried to win the mayor's position, and managed to find an agreement with the Social Democrats, the Danish Social Liberal Party and the Green Left, an untraditional agreement with 3 parties from the red bloc.

Electoral system
For elections to Danish municipalities, a number varying from 9 to 31 are chosen to be elected to the municipal council. The seats are then allocated using the D'Hondt method and a closed list proportional representation.
Allerød Municipality had 21 seats in 2021

Unlike in Danish General Elections, in elections to municipal councils, electoral alliances are allowed.

Electoral alliances  

Electoral Alliance 1

Electoral Alliance 2

Electoral Alliance 3

Results

Notes

References 

Allerød